Rodgers Kwemoi Chumo (born 3 March 1997) is a Kenyan long-distance runner specialising in the 5000 metres and 10,000 metres. He is the 2018 Commonwealth Games bronze medallist at the longer distance.

Born in Kenya's Mount Elgon District, he made his international debut in the junior race at the 2015 IAAF World Cross Country Championships, where his tenth-place finish helped the Kenyan men to the team title. As a result of this, he was signed up by the Asian Kogyo corporate team in Japan. In the 2016 season he won at the Kenyan junior trials and went on to claim the 10,000 m gold medal at the 2016 IAAF World U20 Championships in championship record time.

Kwemoi won back-to-back titles at the Tilburg Ten Miles in 2016 and 2017, but failed to make the national team in the latter season. He topped the national trials race for the 2018 Commonwealth Games, however, which led to the 10,000 m bronze medal at the event in Gold Coast, Queensland.

In 2019, he placed fourth in 10,000m final at the World Championships in Doha.

Kwemoi qualified to represent Kenya at the 2020 Tokyo Olympics, where he placed seventh in the 10,000 m.

International competitions

Personal bests
Outdoor

References

External links

Living people
1997 births
People from Mount Elgon District
Kenyan male long-distance runners
Kenyan male cross country runners
Commonwealth Games bronze medallists for Kenya
Commonwealth Games medallists in athletics
Athletes (track and field) at the 2018 Commonwealth Games
Athletes (track and field) at the 2020 Summer Olympics
Olympic athletes of Kenya
Medallists at the 2018 Commonwealth Games